Coenraad Lauwers (1632 in Antwerp – 1685 in Antwerp) was a Flemish engraver, etcher and print seller.  He was mainly active as a reproducer of works of leading Antwerp painters.

Life
He was the son of Nicolaes Lauwers and Maria Vermeulen and was baptized on 20 June 1632.  His father was also an engraver, etcher and print seller.  He likely trained with his father and may have worked in the family workshop.

In the years 1657 to 1659 he was in Paris. The Flemish artist biographer Cornelis de Bie included a short poem about him on page 562 of his book of artist biographies, Het Gulden Cabinet, with the remark that from his visits to Paris Lauwers brought back prints by the French engravers François Polly and Robert Nanteuil to sell them in his shop.   In París he engraved after the designs of Laurent de La Hyre the majority of the images of Christian saints that formed the series Porticus religiosa effigies.  The images were executed in grisaille to resemble the statutes of these saints of the convent of the Minimes Brothers at la Place Royale of Paris.

He was registered as a pupil at the Antwerp Guild of St. Luke in the guild year 1626-1627. He was registered in the registers of the Guild in the capacity of a wijnmeester (master who is the son of a (former) member of the Guild) in the specialty of engraver in the guild year 1660-1661. He also became in the same year a member of the "Sodaliteit van de Bejaerde Jongmans", a fraternity for senior bachelors established by the Jesuit order in Antwerp.

He died in Antwerp in 1685.

Work
Like his father Nicolaes, he is known for engravings after Rubens. He further engraved the portraits of Artus Quellinus II, Joris van Son, Pieter van Bredael, Pieter Boel, and Pieter Verbruggen the Elder for Cornelis de Bie's book of artist biographies, Het Gulden Cabinet. 

He was one of the engravers who collaborated on the Theatrum Pictorium (Theatre of Painting), a book published in the 1660s by David Teniers the Younger for his employer, the Archduke Leopold Wilhelm of Austria. It was a catalog of 243 Italian paintings in the Archduke's collection of over 1300 paintings, with engravings of the paintings taken from small models that Teniers had personally prepared. David Teniers' brother Abraham Teniers was involved in organizing the publication of the work.

He made reproductions of Rubens' tapestry cartoons for the series on the Eucharist commissioned around 1625 by Isabella Clara Eugenia for the monastery of the Descalzas Reales in Madrid (Elijah and the Angel, The Defenders of the Eucharist and The Four Evangelists). He engraved Rubens' Marriage of the Virgin after an engraving by Schelte Bolswert.

References

External links
 

1632 births
1685 deaths
17th-century engravers
Flemish engravers
Painters from Antwerp